Metropolitan Transit/Transportation Commission/Corporation may refer to:

 Metropolitan Transportation Commission, San Francisco Bay Area, California
 Metropolitan Transport Corporation, Chennai, India
 Metro Transit, Minneapolis–Saint Paul, Minnesota, formerly Metropolitan Transit Commission

See also
 San Francisco Municipal Transportation Agency
 Metro Transit (disambiguation)
 MTC (disambiguation)
 MTA (disambiguation)